Mariano Puerta was the defending champion but did not compete that year.

Fernando Vicente won in the final 6–4, 7–6(8–6) against Juan Ignacio Chela.

Seeds
A champion seed is indicated in bold text while text in italics indicates the round in which that seed was eliminated.

  Albert Costa (first round)
  Fernando Vicente (champion)
  Juan Ignacio Chela (final)
  Nicolás Massú (first round)
  Guillermo Coria (quarterfinals)
  Markus Hantschk (second round)
  Andrei Stoliarov (quarterfinals)
  Fernando Meligeni (first round)

Draw

External links
 2001 Cerveza Club Colombia Open draw

Bancolombia Open
2001 ATP Tour